Richard Newman ( - 1695), of Fifehead Magdalen, Dorset, was an important member of the ancient Newman family of Wessex, a barrister, High Steward of Westminster, Lord of Fifehead-Magdalen and Evercreech. He was also a Colonel in the Royalist forces during the English Civil War.

Background
Richard Newman was born at Fifehead Magdalen, Dorset, the son of Richard Newman and Elizabeth née Perry. He was educated at Sherborne, to which he later donated "two gloabes", Pembroke College, Oxford and Middle Temple.

English Civil War
Newman was appointed High Steward of Westminster and joined the Royalist forces during the English Civil War with the rank of Colonel. He lent money in support of Charles I, and in 1651 assisted the young King Charles II escape after the Battle of Worcester, where Charles's largely Scottish army was defeated at the hands of Oliver Cromwell's New Model Army. According to contemporary sources, the king escaped through the gate of the city of Worcester solely through the heroic efforts of Colonel Newman.

Newman was imprisoned for his efforts in supporting the king, though it is not known where or when. At the Restoration in 1660, Charles II rewarded Newman with an augmentation to his coat of arms, in the form of an escutcheon gules (red shield) and a crowned portcullis or (gold coloured portcullis surmounted by a crown), and a large sum of money, which is likely to have been a reimbursement of funds loaned to Charles I.

Family life
He inherited the Fifehead-Magdalen manor from his father The Baron of Castle Cary, Richard Newman, although being the youngest of two brothers.

He married Anne, the daughter of Sir Charles Harbord,  Surveyor General to Charles I, and Maria née van Aelst, and had four sons, the eldest of whom, Richard Newman, who succeeded him at Fifehead Magdalen, and three daughters including Elizabeth who married Sir William Honeywood.

He retained the family's home in Fifehead, where in 1693 he was responsible for building the Newman chapel on the north side of the church to cover the vault containing the remains of his ancestors, where his own remains were interred on 16 October 1695.

References

1620s births
1695 deaths
Alumni of Pembroke College, Oxford
People educated at Sherborne School
People from Dorset
English barristers